Kårböle stave church (St Olav's sacrifice church) is a reconstructed stave church in Kårböle, Ljusdal municipality, Gävleborg County, Sweden.

The church is from 1989. It's built at a site where pilgrims stopped to perform ritual sacrifice on their long walk to Nidarosdomen in Norway, during pilgrimage in the 12th century.

External links 
 Image of Kårböle stave church
 The Churches in Karbole

Hälsingland
Ljusdal Municipality
Replicas of stave churches in Sweden
Churches in Gävleborg County
Churches in the Diocese of Uppsala